Freshly Squeezed... the Early Years is a semi-official compilation of the English rock band Pulp's early material recorded from 1983 to 1992 and originally released on the London independent label Fire. It was released in North America only.

Track listing
All songs written by Pulp, except "My Lighthouse" written by Jarvis Cocker and Simon Hinkler.

"My Lighthouse" – 3:28
"My Legendary Girlfriend" – 6:48
"Don't You Want Me Anymore?" – 3:47
"She's Dead" – 5:05
"Little Girl (With Blue Eyes)" – 3:26
"Down by the River" – 3:38
"Blue Glow" – 3:04
"I Want You" – 4:41
"They Suffocate at Night" – 6:18
"Master of the Universe" – 3:20
"Countdown" (single version) – 4:39

References

1998 compilation albums
Pulp (band) albums